Sweet Earth Flying is an album by American jazz saxophonist Marion Brown recorded in 1974 and released on the Impulse! label. Along with Afternoon of a Georgia Faun and Geechee Recollections, it was one of Brown's albums dedicated to the US state of Georgia.

Reception
The Allmusic review by Brian Olewnick awarded the album  stars stating "Sweet Earth Flying is arguably Marion Brown's finest work and certainly one of the underappreciated treasures of '70s jazz... Very highly recommended to open-eared jazz fans of all tastes".

Track listing
All compositions by Marion Brown except as indicated
 "Sweet Earth Flying Part 1" - 3:38 
 "Sweet Earth Flying Part 3" - 5:55 
 "Sweet Earth Flying Part 4: Prince Willie" (Brown, Bill Hasson) - 5:55 
 "Sweet Earth Flying Part 5" - 5:06 
 "Eleven Light City Part 1" - 7:16 
 "Eleven Light City Part 2" - 2:08 
 "Eleven Light City Part 3" - 5:50 
 "Eleven Light City Part 4" - 3:04

Personnel
 Marion Brown — alto saxophone, soprano saxophone
 Muhal Richard Abrams (tracks 2–8), Paul Bley (tracks 1, 2, 5–8) — piano, electric piano, organ
 James Jefferson — bass, electric bass
 Steve McCall — drums, percussion
 Bill Hasson — percussion, narration

References

Impulse! Records albums
Marion Brown albums
1974 albums